The year 1875 in archaeology involved some significant events.

Explorations

Excavations
Ernst Curtius begins excavations at Olympia, Greece which continue until 1881.
Archaeological survey of Adhai Din Ka Jhonpra in Ajmer, British India, begins.
Lovatelli urn found during Edoardo Brizio excavation of the columbarium of the Statilia on the Esquiline in Rome

Publications
William Collings Lukis:
A Guide to the Principal Chambered Barrows and other Pre-historic Monuments in the Islands of the Morbihan, the communes of Locmariaker, Carnac, Plouharnel and Erdeven, and the peninsulas of Quiberon and Rhuis, Brittany.
On the class of rude stone monuments which are commonly called in England cromlechs, and in France dolmens, and are here shown to have been the sepulchral chambers of once-existing mounds.

Births
October 21 – Sir Guy Francis Laking, English art historian, keeper of the London Museum (d. 1919)
November 19 – Hiram Bingham III, American explorer of South America (d. 1933)
December 13 – Arthur Callender, English engineer and archaeologist, assistant to Howard Carter during the excavation of Tutankhamun's tomb (d. 1936)

Deaths 
 April 30 – Jean-Frédéric Waldeck, French antiquarian, artist and explorer (b. 1766?)
 October 29 – John Gardiner Wilkinson, English traveller, writer and pioneer Egyptologist (b. 1797)

See also
Ancient Egypt / Egyptology

References

Archaeology by year
Archaeology
Archaeology
Archaeology